The Asian Racing Federation (ARF) is a regional federation comprising 29 national horse racing authorities and racing-related organisations from across Asia, Oceania, Africa and the Middle East.

The ARF is formally linked with the International Federation of Horseracing Authorities (IFHA). Australia, Hong Kong and Japan have permanent seats representing the ARF on the Executive Council of the IFHA, and the ARF also nominates one of two rotational positions on the IFHA Executive Council.

Established in 1960 as the Asian Racing Conference (ARC), the ARF was formally established as a permanent organisation in at the 28th ARC in 2001. 

The Executive Council meets four times annually and is chaired by Winfried Engelbrecht-Bresges GBS JP. 

The ARF has a central Secretariat that is based in Hong Kong.

External links
 http://www.asianracing.org/

Horse racing organizations
Horse racing in Asia
Cartels